Cepelinai ( "zeppelins"; singular: cepelinas) or didžkukuliai are potato dumplings made from grated and riced potatoes and stuffed with ground meat, dry curd cheese or mushrooms. It has been described as a national dish of Lithuania, and is typically served as a main dish.

The name of cepelinai comes from their shape that resembles of a Zeppelin airship. Cepelinai are typically around 10–20 cm long, although the size depends on where they are made: in the western counties of Lithuania cepelinai are made bigger than in the east. In Samogitia cepelinai are called cepelinā.

After boiling, the cepelinai are often served with sour cream sauce and bacon bits or pork rinds.

In the Suwałki Region, Podlachia, Warmia and Masuria it is known as kartacz (: grapeshot). It is a part of the cuisine of north-eastern Poland.

Similar dishes include Polish pyzy, Swedish kroppkaka, Acadian poutine râpée, Norwegian raspeball, German Kartoffelklöße and Italian canederli.

See also
 Ba-wan

References

External links
Potato dishes of Lithuania

Lithuanian cuisine
Polish cuisine
Potato dishes
Dumplings
National dishes

no:Raspeball